Infinity Field is an iOS shooter video game developed by British studio Chillingo and released on 27 January 2011.

Reception 

The game has a Metacritic score of 86% based on 11 critic reviews.

References 

2011 video games
IOS games
IOS-only games
Shooter video games
Video games developed in the United Kingdom
Chillingo games